Dyschirius strumosus is a species of ground beetle in the subfamily Scaritinae. It was described by Wilhelm Ferdinand Erichson in 1837.

References

strumosus
Beetles described in 1837